Typhlacontias gracilis, Roux's blind dart skink, is a species of lizard which is found in Namibia, Zimbabwe, Botswana, and Zambia.

References

gracilis
Reptiles described in 1907
Taxa named by Jean Roux